Allium victorialis, commonly known as victory onion, Alpine leek, and Alpine broad-leaf allium is a broad-leaved Eurasian species of wild onion. It is a perennial of the Amaryllis family that occurs widely in mountainous regions of Europe and parts of Asia (Caucasus and Himalayas).

Some authors consider certain East Asian and Alaskan populations as constituting subspecies platyphyllum within the species Allium victorialis. Recent sources recognize this group as a distinct species, called Allium ochotense.

General description 
Leaves are broad, elliptical or lanceolate. Flowers  (perianths) are whitish green.

Distribution
Allium victorialis is found widely across mountain ranges Europe, as well as the Caucasus and the Himalayas.

Nomenclature 
The specific epithet victorialis comes from the German Siegwurz (Root of Victory), and it earned this name having been "worn as an amulet, to be as safeguard against the attacks of certain impure spirits," by Bohemian miners among others.

Uses
The plant, in past centuries in certain mountainous regions of Europe, "was cultivated as a medicinal and fetish plant". It was also recorded as consumed by Ainu people in northern Japan.

See also
sansai
ramsons
Allium tricoccum (ramps)

References

Bibliography

External links 
 
 

victorialis
Flora of Europe
Flora of temperate Asia
Japanese vegetables
Plants described in 1753
Taxa named by Carl Linnaeus
Onions